The 65th edition of the Vuelta a Colombia was held from 2 to 15 August 2015. The race was won by Óscar Sevilla.

Teams
Eighteen teams entered the race. Each team had a maximum of ten riders.

Route

References

Vuelta a Colombia
Colombia
Vuelta Colombia